Alan Munro (born 14 January 1967) is an English flat racing jockey.

He has won many major races including The Derby and the Irish Derby in 1991. He also rode Sergeant Cecil to win the Northumberland Plate, the Ebor Handicap and the Cesarewitch in the same season, a feat never achieved before.

Major wins
 Great Britain
 Derby – Generous (1991)
 King George VI and Queen Elizabeth Stakes – Generous (1991)
 St. James's Palace Stakes – Araafa (2006)

 France
 Prix d'Ispahan – Zoman (1992)

 Hong Kong
 Hong Kong Champions & Chater Cup) – Indigenous (1997)
 Hong Kong Gold Cup – Industrialist (2000)
 Queen Elizabeth II Cup – Industrialist (2000)

 Ireland
 Irish 2,000 Guineas – Araafa (2006)
 Irish Derby – Generous (1991)
 Phoenix Stakes – Mac's Imp (1990)
 Tattersalls Gold Cup – Zoman (1991)

 Italy
 Oaks d'Italia – Bright Generation (1993)
 Premio Lydia Tesio – Eva's Request (2009)
 Premio Presidente della Repubblica  – Great Palm (1993)

 United States
 Washington, D.C. International Stakes – Zoman (1992)

References

English jockeys
Lester Award winners
1967 births
Living people